The Öfnerspitze is a 2,576 m (2,575 m in Austrian maps) high, rocky mountain in the  Allgäu Alps.

Location and area 
The Öfnerspitze lies southeast of the Krottenspitze and is joined to it by a flat saddle.

Ascent 
There are no marked trails to the Öfnerspitze. The easiest approach branches off the path to the Muttlerkopf and is partly marked by cairns and difficult to find. It requires sure-footedness and experience in navigating through trackless terrain. For this reason the Öfnerspitze is relatively rarely climbed; in addition the nearby Großer Krottenkopf is higher and has a view that is just majestic if not more so.

Sources 
Thaddäus Steiner: Allgäuer Bergnamen, Lindenberg, Kunstverlag Josef Fink, 2007, 
Thaddäus Steiner: Die Flurnamen der Gemeinde Oberstdorf im Allgäu, Munich, Selbstverlag des Verbandes für Flurnamenforschung in Bayern, 1972
Zettler/Groth: Alpenvereinsführer Allgäuer Alpen. Munich, Bergverlag Rudolf Rother 1984.

External links 

Mountains of the Alps
Mountains of Bavaria
Mountains of Tyrol (state)
Two-thousanders of Austria
Oberallgäu
Allgäu Alps
Two-thousanders of Germany